Templestowe Lower is a suburb of Melbourne, Victoria, Australia, 14 km northeast of Melbourne's Central Business District, located within the City of Manningham local government area.

Its name reflects the fact that Lower Templestowe is situated on the Yarra River, but downstream from the neighbouring suburb of Templestowe. It is bounded in the west by Rose Avenue, Russell Street and Sheahans Road, in the north by the Yarra River, in the east by Ruffey Creek and Williamsons Road and in the south generally by Manningham Road.

It is home to primary schools and a secondary school; Templestowe Secondary College. Like neighbouring Templestowe, it is poorly serviced by public transportation, lying geographically between three existing rail lines (Hurstbridge and Lilydale/Belgrave). An excellent and frequent bus service exists, running from Lower Templestowe into the city or to the nearest train lines.

History

The Traditional Owners of the land that came to be known as Lower Templestowe were the Wurundjeri people. They never relinquished ownership, rather, the land was stolen from them by British Colonial Authorities.

In 1841 Frederic Unwin, a Sydney solicitor, purchased 5,120 acres, or eight square miles of land, including most of the present suburb of Lower Templestowe, from the Crown, for one pound an acre under the terms of the short-lived Special Survey regulations. The area was sometimes known as Unwin's Special Survey. Many European immigrants moved to Lower Templestowe in the 1970s. Lower Templestowe Post Office opened around 1902 and closed in 1973.

Points of interest

Lower Templestowe has one shopping centre, Macedon Square and Macedon Plaza. Templestowe Hotel, despite the name, is actually located in Lower Templestowe.

Lower Templestowe boasts two parks by the Yarra River, Birrarung Park and Finns Reserve. Both parks offer walking tracks, and access to the river for swimming and rafting.

Education

Lower Templestowe has 2 government primary schools; Templestowe Valley Primary School and Templestowe Heights Primary School, as well as a Catholic primary school; St Kevin's. There is also a secondary college; Templestowe College.

Transport

Like all other suburbs in the Local Government Area of Manningham, Lower Templestowe does not have any tram or train services. Lower Templestowe is served solely by buses in terms of public transport.

Lower Templestowe's main roads include High Street, Lynwood Parade, Thompsons Road, Manningham Road and Williamsons Road.

Notable residents

 Kim Crow, Olympic rower
 Scott Martin, an Australian shot putter, who is best known for appearing on Commonwealth Bank TV advertisements, which aired during the 2006 Commonwealth Games.
 Mark Wilson – Ran a dance studio on Thompsons Road until it was burnt down in 2008.

See also
 City of Doncaster & Templestowe – Templestowe Lower was previously within this former local government area.

References

Suburbs of Melbourne
Suburbs of the City of Manningham